William John Rutherford (23 January 1930 – 29 April 1980) was a Scottish footballer who made 16 appearances in the Scottish Football League playing for Ayr United and Stirling Albion and 427 appearances in the English Football League playing for Darlington and Southport. A wing half, he was active in league football from 1949 to 1964. He also played in Scottish junior football for Dunoon Athletic and in English non-league football for Kirkby Town.

Rutherford was a member of the Darlington team that inflicted an embarrassing defeat on Chelsea, league champions only three seasons earlier, to eliminate them from the 1957–58 FA Cup by four goals to one.

References

External links
 Southport FC-related profile at Port Online

1930 births
1980 deaths
Footballers from Bellshill
Scottish footballers
Association football wing halves
Ayr United F.C. players
Stirling Albion F.C. players
Darlington F.C. players
Southport F.C. players
Knowsley United F.C. players
Scottish Football League players
English Football League players